Belmond El Encanto is a hotel in Santa Barbara, California.
It was established during the early 1900s as the El Encanto Hotel, when it was popular with artists of the plein air school, celebrities and the "carriage trade" from the East Coast. Guests during the early days of Hollywood included Hedy Lamarr, Clark Gable and Carole Lombard.

Chronology

References

External links 

Belmond.com
Facebook Page
Twitter Profile

Belmond hotels
Hotels in California